A bayamo is a violent wind blowing from the land on the south coast of Cuba, especially near the Bight of Bayamo.
It is also the namesake for Giddings and Webster's most popular tuba mouthpiece.

See also
Squall

References
 Winds

Winds